Ghattamaneni is an Indian surname (also spelt as Gattamneni or Gattamaneni). Notable people with the surname include:

 Ghattamaneni Krishna is famous Telugu film actor and producer
 Ghattamaneni Mahesh Babu is famous Telugu film actor
 Ghattamaneni Manjula is an Indian film producer and actor
 Ghattamaneni Ramesh Babu is an Indian film producer and actor
 Ghattamaneni Venkat is an Indian entrepreneur and Technologist

Surnames of Indian origin